The Wichita Wind Surge are a Minor League Baseball team of the Texas League and the Double-A affiliate of the Minnesota Twins. They are located in Wichita, Kansas, and began play in 2021 at Riverfront Stadium.

The Wind Surge were supposed to begin play in 2020 as the Triple-A affiliate of the Miami Marlins in the Pacific Coast League. However, a combination of the cancellation of the 2020 season due to the COVID-19 pandemic and Major League Baseball's realignment of the minor leagues for 2021, resulted in the team dropping down to Double-A as affiliates of the Twins without having played a Triple-A game.

History
Prior to 2020, the Wind Surge had been located in Metairie, Louisiana, playing as the New Orleans Baby Cakes. The team had been there since 1993 when the Denver Zephyrs had been forced to move due to the creation of the Colorado Rockies expansion franchise in Major League Baseball. The team's history is traced back to 1888, with the founding of the Kansas City Blues.

In September 2018, the city of Wichita paid US$2.2 million to the Wichita Wingnuts to break their lease at Lawrence–Dumont Stadium, with plans to demolish it and build a larger ballpark to host an affiliated Minor League Baseball team. The city later announced that a new $75 million stadium would be built to host the Triple-A New Orleans Baby Cakes, who agreed to relocate to Wichita beginning with the 2020 season.

The club announced its nickname, Wind Surge, in November 2019. The name was met with criticism from Wichita residents following the announcement. Later in the day the name was announced, a Change.org petition was started to change the name. In less than 24 hours, the petition had already collected over 7,400 signatures.

Prior to the COVID-19 pandemic, the Wind Surge were scheduled to begin their inaugural season on the road playing against the Round Rock Express on April 8, 2020, and to play their first home game on April 14 against the Memphis Redbirds. Initially postponed due to the pandemic, the season was ultimately cancelled on June 30. Owner Lou Schwechheimer died from complications from COVID on July 29, 2020.

In 2021, the team dropped to the Double-A classification without having played a Triple-A game due to Major League Baseball's realignment of the minor leagues after the 2020 season. Instead of being a Miami Marlins affiliate, the Wind Surge became affiliated with the Minnesota Twins. They were placed in the Double-A Central. Wichita began competition in the new league on May 4 with a 2–0 victory over the Springfield Cardinals at Hammons Field in Springfield, Missouri. The Wind Surge won the Northern Division title by finishing the 2021 season in first place with a 69–51 record. They qualified for the championship playoffs by possessing the league's best record. In the best-of-five series, they were defeated by the second-place Northwest Arkansas Naturals, 3–2. Wichita manager Ramon Borrego was selected as the league's Manager of the Year. In 2022, the Double-A Central became known as the Texas League, the name historically used by the regional circuit prior to the 2021 reorganization.

Roster

References

External links
Official website

 
2020 establishments in Kansas
Baseball teams established in 2020
Defunct Pacific Coast League teams
Miami Marlins minor league affiliates
Minnesota Twins minor league affiliates
Sports in Wichita, Kansas
Texas League teams